The Northern New South Wales Football Zone League One is an Australian soccer league situated in the Northern NSW Football Association. It is the fourth tier of football in a six-tier system behind the NPL Northern NSW, Northern NSW State League Division 1 and Zone Premier League.

Teams are currently not promoted or relegated between Northern NSW State League Division 1 and Zone Premier League.

The players in the league are amateur.

2023 season teams 
The competition is made up of 10 teams, each playing each other twice, home and away.

Bolwarra Lorn JSC P
Hamilton Azzurri FC (FC Novocastria) P
Mayfield United Junior FC P
Merewether Advance SFC
New Lambton Junior FC
Newcastle Croatia FC P
North United Wolves FC
South Maitland FC P
Stockton Sharks Football
Wallsend FC
Italics indicate club possesses another team in a higher league.

P Promoted.

All teams are required to present in three grades, firsts, reserves and third.

References

 Zone League Competitions
 Northern NSW Football Federation
 Newcastle Football
 Macquarie Football
 Hunter Valley Football

Soccer leagues in New South Wales